The New Armenia was a bi-monthly periodical published in New York City between 1904 and 1929. Its editor was Arshag D. Mahdesian. It was affiliated with the Reformed Hunchakian party, a splinter of the Hunchakian Party  Initially named Armenia, the journal best "exemplified the efforts toward the construction of an Armenian-American ideological, cultural coverage." According to the Columbia University Libraries, it "introduced the English-speaking world to Armenian history, culture and national aspirations."

References

1904 establishments in New York City
1929 disestablishments in New York (state)
Bimonthly magazines published in the United States
Magazines established in 1904
Magazines disestablished in 1929
Magazines published in New York City
Defunct magazines published in the United States
Social Democrat Hunchakian Party